The Capobastone is a high-ranking 'Ndrangheta who is in charge of a 'ndrina. It is the Calabrian equivalent for the Sicilian Capomandamento.

Rule
In a 'ndrina, the Capobastone make the most important decisions, and report only at the "Capo crimine", the head of the "Crimine". Sometimes he can take the control of all 'Ndrangheta, but he has to be elected by the various Capibastone.

References

History of the 'Ndrangheta
Organized crime terminology
Organized crime members by role